Euan Walters (born 12 November 1970) is an Australian professional golfer.

Early life and professional career
Walters was born in Melbourne, Australia. He turned professional in 1994.

Walters has played on the PGA Tour of Australasia since 1996. He won one tournament, the 2004 Jacob's Creek Open Championship, which was co-sanctioned by the Nationwide Tour. This earned him membership on the Nationwide Tour for the rest of 2004 and he finished 14th on the money list, earning him his PGA Tour card for 2005. On the 2005 PGA Tour, he made only two cuts in 18 events and his best finish was T-62 at the WGC-American Express Championship. He played the Nationwide Tour again in 2006 and then resumed playing on the PGA Tour of Australasia.

Professional wins (3)

PGA Tour of Australasia wins (1)

1Co-sanctioned by the Nationwide Tour

PGA Tour of Australasia playoff record (0–1)

Nationwide Tour wins (1)

1Co-sanctioned by the PGA Tour of Australasia

Other wins (2)
1999 New South Wales PGA Championship, Western Australia PGA Championship

Results in major championships

CUT = missed the halfway cut
Note: Walters never played in the Masters Tournament or the PGA Championship.

Results in World Golf Championships

"T" = Tied

See also
2004 Nationwide Tour graduates

References

External links

Australian male golfers
PGA Tour of Australasia golfers
PGA Tour golfers
Korn Ferry Tour graduates
Golfers from Melbourne
1970 births
Living people